The Mather House in Convent, Louisiana, also known as Breaux-Mather House, was built in c.1811.  It was listed on the U.S. National Register of Historic Places in 2001.

It is a one-story French Creole frame cottage facing south onto River Road (Louisiana Highway 44), on the east (north) bank of the Mississippi River, in St. James Parish.

References

Creole architecture in Louisiana
Houses on the National Register of Historic Places in Louisiana
Houses completed in 1811
Houses in St. James Parish, Louisiana
National Register of Historic Places in St. James Parish, Louisiana